Kalmanmolnaria is a monotypic genus of nematodes belonging to the family Skrjabillanidae. The only species is Kalmanmolnaria intestinalis.

References

Rhabditida
Rhabditida genera
Monotypic animal genera